A stay away, also known as a stay-away or stayaway, is a form of protest where people are told to "stay away" from work, similar to a general strike.

In Zimbabwe 
Stay Away is a form of non-violent protest action occurring in Zimbabwe in response to the Robert Mugabe's government.

According to SW Radio Africa, this form of protest has the support of all major civic bodies in the country. It calls for a solid one- or two-day "stay away" from work to protest in a manner that will not expose people to the violence and intimidation of the police and the army. Stay-away campaigns are often communicated through e-mail and text messaging.

"Just stay at home - do your buying on Wednesday and then take a 4-day break. Do not go out if you can avoid it as there may be trouble and the safest place for you is at home."

In South Africa 
Stay aways were also used by organizers of the South African insurrection of 1984-1986, with over 40 stay aways used in 1985 and 1986 alone. Between August 1984 and December 1986, four times more political work stoppages were staged than in the entire preceding three and a half decades. In addition to school boycotts, general strikes and guerrilla action taken by the ANC, they made South Africa ungovernable and forced the Apartheid government to gradually reform until it was finally abolished in 1994.

See also
 Apartheid
 African National Congress
 South Africa

Notes 

Politics of Zimbabwe
Labor disputes